The women's triple jump at the 2022 World Athletics Indoor Championships took place on 20 March 2022.

Summary
Kimberly Williams opened the competition with a season best 14.59m.  Three jumpers later, Thea LaFond came close with a 14.53m.  Then Yulimar Rojas made her first attempt, 15.19m.  Game over.  Only one other competitor had ever gone over 15 metres. The battle would be for the other medals.

Those three jumps, from the first 5 attempts in the competition, held the medal positions until the last jump of the fifth round, when Rojas improved her hold on the lead to 15.36m. Only the 9th best jump of her career, it was a distance only three other jumpers had ever achieved. The next jumper on the runway was Ukrainian Maryna Bekh-Romanchuk. After training through the first weeks of the 2022 Russian invasion of Ukraine, then being shuttled out of the country for these championships, she put together a massive personal best 14.74m to rocket from eighth to second. While Williams was able to improve on her final attempt, 14.62m still left her in bronze medal position. Already confirmed as the winner, Rojas made one more attempt down the runway.

Results
The final was started at 11:00.

References

Triple jump
Triple jump at the World Athletics Indoor Championships